Hendrik Verheijen (16 March 1899 – 18 December 1967) was a Dutch weightlifter. He competed in the men's heavyweight event at the 1928 Summer Olympics.

References

1899 births
1967 deaths
Dutch male weightlifters
Olympic weightlifters of the Netherlands
Weightlifters at the 1928 Summer Olympics
Sportspeople from The Hague
20th-century Dutch people